Bacchus is an opera in four acts by Jules Massenet to a French libretto by Catulle Mendès after Greek mythology.  It was first performed at the Palais Garnier in Paris on 5 May 1909.

The story is based on the mythology surrounding Bacchus and Ariadne (Ariane).  The Gods, among them the demi-god Bacchus, appear in human form in ancient India to attempt to persuade the people away from the pervading Buddhist influence.  Ariane has followed them, convinced that Bacchus is in fact Theseus, her unrequited love.  In the end, Ariane sacrifices herself to save humanity and in doing so, Bacchus becomes a God.

Although not a proper sequel, as Ariane dies in both pieces, Bacchus is a companion to Massenet's earlier opera, Ariane.  Of Massenet's twenty-five operas, Bacchus is probably the least known, without a modern performance history or single modern recording of even an excerpt.

The story of this opera is also related to that of Ariadne auf Naxos from Richard Strauss.

Roles

There are also a number of dance roles in the various ballets.

List of musical numbers

Act I, The Underworld 

 "Hélas!" - Voices of Spirits
 "Pourpre déchue, encens funèbres" - Perséphone
 Dance by the Spectres of the Roses
 "Ariane n'est point chez les morts douloureux" - Companions of Perséphone
 "Tourne, fuseau du sort" - Clotho
 "Il n'est destin, hasards, ni volonté de l'homme" - Antéros
 An apparition (The travels of Bacchus and Ariane, as shown to Persephone and her companions)

Act II
Scene 1, in Nepal
 Arrival of the Beggar Monks to the Réverénd Ramavaçou
 "L'apparence n'est rien" - Réverénd Ramavaçou
 "Quel brut déchire le silence?" - Réverénd Ramavaçou
 "Io! Io! Pœan! Evohé!" - the tumult
 "Une tourbe énorme s'élance" - Pourna
 "Plein de toi, vigneron divin" - Silène
 "Il vacille!" - Réverénd Ramavaçou
 "Tu mens! L'eau du fleueve n'est pas verte" - Mahouda
 "Le Règle est blasphémée" - Amahelli
 "Cent viharas sacrés et vingt cités profanes" - Amahelli
 Invocation: "Très saint qui nous promis la paix définitive" - Amahelli
 "Dans l'âpre forêt de rocs et d'arbres tours" - Réverénd Ramavaçou
 Sacred chant: "O fils sans mère d'un père Dieu"  - Voices of distant priests. Setting of an Ancient Greek Melody
 The Triumph of Bacchus
 "Mortels! La vie est dans le monde!" - Bacchus
 "N'est-il pas l'heure aussi qu'à l'épouse l'époux sourie?" - Ariane
 "Et je ris, doucement mourante, selon mes vœux" - Ariane
 "Roi, par fauves troupeaux, d'affreux géants camards hurlent" - Silène
 "Tant d'émoi pour quelque harde échappée" - Bacchus

Interlude: The Battle of the Monkeys"Scene 2: After the Battle "Vois! par l'arme de pierre et l'ongle et la mâchoire" - Réverénd Ramavaçou
 "Sortis enfin de leur torpeur" - Amahelli
 "Ah! je m'éveille! Un rêve!" - Ariane
 "Zeus immortel! Ton fils va-t-il devenir Dieu?" - Bacchus
 "Qu'il soit prisonnier!" - Amahelli

Act 3Scene 1: A Terrace of the Palace of the Sakias'''
 Prelude
 "Sur quel point de l'erreur ou de la connaissance" - Kéléyï

Notes

References

External links

Operas
Operas by Jules Massenet
French-language operas
1909 operas
Dionysus in art
Operas based on classical mythology
Opera world premieres at the Paris Opera
Operas set in India
Ariadne